American Epic: The Best of Blind Willie Johnson is a compilation album released to accompany the award-winning American Epic documentary film series. It collects performances from Blind Willie Johnson's five recording sessions for Columbia Records in Dallas, Atlanta, and New Orleans between 1927 and 1930. The album was released as a 16-track download and a vinyl LP.

Background 
During production on the American Epic films it was decided to close the historical documentaries with a piece on Blind Willie Johnson and the placing of his song "Dark Was the Night, Cold Was the Ground" on a golden record fastened to the sides of the two Voyager space probes. The success of the audio restoration of "Dark Was the Night, Cold Was the Ground" inspired the filmmakers to source the best surviving masters of their favorite Johnson performances and reissue them on an album.

Compilation 
Blind Willie Johnson was first recorded by Columbia Records scout Frank Buckley Walker at a temporary studio in the Deep Ellum neighborhood of Dallas, Texas on December 3, 1927. Johnson performed a gospel repertoire within a blues framework. His powerful bass vocal had a unique gravelly timbre and was accompanied by his distinctive and highly influential slide guitar. On five of the performances on the album he was accompanied by the female vocal of his wife, Willie B. Harris. By his final recording session in 1930, Johnson's records, released in the midst of the Great Depression, were "selling almost twice as many copies as Bessie Smith, and three and four times as many as most of the country blues artists"

The album features gospel call and response songs like "John the Revelator", about John of Patmos, the writer of the Book of Revelation who recounts the opening of seven seals and the ensuing apocalyptic events and "Keep Your Lamp Trimmed and Burning" about the Parable of the Ten Virgins from the Gospel of Matthew, 25:1-13. It includes traditional biblical songs like "If I Had My Way, I'd Tear the Building Down" that relates the story of Samson and Delilah. It contains songs about twentieth century events like the sinking of RMS Titanic in "God Moves on the Water", songs based on hymns like "Church, I'm Fully Saved To-Day", autobiographical songs like "Mother's Children Have a Hard Time" which deals with Johnson's mother dying when he was very young and traditional gospel blues songs like "Lord I Just Can't Keep From Crying", "Trouble Will Soon Be Over" and "Praise God I'm Satisfied". It closes with his most famous composition a wordless moan accompanied by slide guitar entitled "Dark Was the Night, Cold Was the Ground" that was included by NASA on the Voyager Golden Record.

The songs featured on the compilation have been hugely influential to subsequent musicians and have been covered by Reverend Gary Davis, Son House, Sister Rosetta Tharpe, Bob Dylan, Tom Waits, Eric Clapton, Lucinda Williams, Dorothy Love Coates, Led Zeppelin, John Sebastian, Eric Burdon, The Grateful Dead, Willie Nelson, Tom Jones, Rosanne Cash, The Staples Singers, Ry Cooder, Bruce Springsteen and Nina Simone.

Restoration 
New sound restoration techniques developed for the American Epic film series were utilized to restore the sixteen recordings on the album. The 78rpm record transfers were made by sound engineer Nicholas Bergh using reverse engineering techniques garnered from working with the restored first electrical sound recording system from the 1920s in The American Epic Sessions. This was followed by meticulous sound restoration on these 1920s recordings, by sound engineers Peter Henderson and Joel Tefteller, to reveal greater fidelity, presence, and clarity than had been heard before.

Release 
The album was released on June 16, 2017, one month after the US broadcast of American Epic. The album was issued as a download by Sony Legacy and a vinyl LP by Third Man Records.

Critical reception 
The work was described by The Village Voice as "re-mastering I can only call profound. Performances you might think you knew sound as if you've never heard them before — never apprehended them." Ian Anderson in fRoots said "you haven't really heard these tracks at all. Not like this. Forget bad dubs of worn-out 78s pressed on poor vinyl. The 'reverse engineering' transfers by Nicholas Bergh and subsequent restorations are so startlingly better, practically everything you will ever have experienced from this era can be discounted. And there's none of that fog of 78 surface noise which many people find too much of a distraction: suddenly, legendary artists are in the room with you."

Track listing

Personnel 

 Blind Willie Johnson - vocals and guitar
  Willie B Harris - backing vocals (tracks 1,5,7,11,14)
 Bernard MacMahon - editor, compiler, producer
 Allison McGourty - producer
 Nicholas Bergh - 78rpm transfers, mastering
 Peter Henderson - restoration, mastering, producer
 Duke Erikson - restoration, mastering, producer
 Joel Tefteller - restoration, mastering
 John Polito - mastering
 Ellis Burman - mastering
 Adam Block - producer
 Patrick Ferris - associate producer
 Jack McLean - associate producer
Nat Strimpopulos – artwork

References

Notes

Bibliography 

 Zack, Ian. Say No to the Devil: The Life and Musical Genius of Rev. Gary Davis. Illinois. University of Chicago Press, 2015. 
 Smith, Clifford D. Evening Light Songs: A Collection of Favorite Hymns and Spiritual Songs for the General Services of the Church (Faith Publishing House 1949) 
 Wald, Elijah & McGourty, Allison & MacMahon, Bernard. American Epic: The First Time America Heard Itself. New York: Touchstone, 2017.  .

External links 
 Official American Epic website

Folk albums by American artists
2017 compilation albums
Folk compilation albums
Compilation albums by American artists
Blues compilation albums
Columbia Records compilation albums
Gospel compilation albums
Blind Willie Johnson albums
American Epic albums
Third Man Records compilation albums
Legacy Recordings compilation albums
LO-MAX Records albums